William Matt Wylie (May 10, 1928 – August 20, 2006) was a politician, farmer, and businessman from the U.S. state of Nebraska.

Born in Elgin, Nebraska, he served in the United States Army and went to Nebraska Wesleyan University in Lincoln, Nebraska. Wylie was a farmer, auctioneer, in the real estate business. He served in the Nebraska State Legislature from 1965 to 1971. His parents Matt Wylie and Fannie B. Wylie also served in the Nebraska State Legislature. Wylie died in Neligh, Nebraska.

Notes

1928 births
2006 deaths
People from Antelope County, Nebraska
Nebraska Wesleyan University alumni
Businesspeople from Nebraska
Farmers from Nebraska
Military personnel from Nebraska
Nebraska state senators
20th-century American politicians
20th-century American businesspeople